Naby Camara (born 10 May 1996) is a Guinean professional footballer who plays as a right-back for Guinée Championnat National club AS Kaloum and the Guinea national team.

International career
Camara made his debut with the Guinea national team in a 1–0 2020 African Nations Championship qualification loss to Liberia on 21 September 2019.

References

External links
 
 
 Hafia Profile
 FDB Profile

1996 births
Living people
Guinean footballers
Guinea international footballers
Association football defenders
Guinean expatriate footballers
Expatriate footballers in Belarus
Hafia FC players
FC Rukh Brest players
Guinée Championnat National players
Guinea A' international footballers
2020 African Nations Championship players
Guinean expatriate sportspeople in Belarus